I Miss You (later reissued as Harold Melvin & the Blue Notes) is the debut album by Harold Melvin & the Blue Notes, released on Philadelphia International in August 25,  1972.  It was produced by Kenneth Gamble & Leon Huff.

The album title was changed from I Miss You to Harold Melvin & the Blue Notes and given a new cover after the success of the single "If You Don't Know Me by Now". The group's roster for this album is Lloyd Parks, Teddy Pendergrass, Harold Melvin, Lawrence Brown and Bernie Wilson.  The album was arranged by Bobby Martin, Norman Harris and Thom Bell.

The album was remastered and reissued with bonus tracks in 2010 by Big Break Records.

Track listing

Personnel

The Blue Notes

 Harold Melvin
 Teddy Pendergrass
 Bernard Wilson
 Lawrence Brown
 Lloyd Parks – vocals

Other personnel
Leon Huff – piano
Leonard Pakula – organ
Ronnie Baker – bass
Earl Young – drums
Norman Harris, Roland Chambers, Bobby Eli – guitar
Larry Washington – congas, bongos
Vince Montana – vibraphone
Don Renaldo and his Strings – strings
Sam Reed and his Horns – horns

Charts

References

External links
 

1972 debut albums
Harold Melvin & the Blue Notes albums
Albums produced by Kenneth Gamble
Albums produced by Leon Huff
Albums arranged by Thom Bell
Albums arranged by Bobby Martin
Albums recorded at Sigma Sound Studios
Philadelphia International Records albums